Prabhu B. Patil is an Indian bacterial geneticist and a senior scientist at the Institute of Microbial Technology. Known for his studies on bacterial genetics, genomics and metagenomics, Patil has published his research findings by way of a number of articles; ResearchGate, an online repository of scientific articles has listed 95 of them. The Department of Biotechnology of the Government of India awarded him the National Bioscience Award for Career Development, one of the highest Indian science awards, for his contributions to biosciences, in 2017–18.

Selected bibliography

See also 

 Xanthomonas
 Gammaproteobacteria

Notes

References

External links 
 
 
 
 

N-BIOS Prize recipients
Indian scientific authors
Year of birth missing (living people)
Scientists from Chandigarh
Indian geneticists
Living people